The 1988 Fidelity Unit Trusts International Open was a professional ranking snooker tournament that took place from August to September 1988 at Trentham Gardens in Stoke-on-Trent, England.

Steve Davis retained the title by defeating Jimmy White 12–6 in the final. Frame 5 of the match between Tony Drago and Danny Fowler was the fastest frame in the history of professional Snooker, with Drago winning 62–0 after just 3 minutes.


Main draw

References

Scottish Open (snooker)
1988 in snooker
1988 in English sport
Sport in Stoke-on-Trent
International Open
International Open